Daniele Giorico (born 1 January 1992) is an Italian footballer who plays as a midfielder for  club Pordenone.

Club career
On 10 January 2019, he joined Virtus Verona on loan until June 2020.

On 17 July 2019, he signed a two-year contract with Triestina.

On 19 July 2022, Giorico joined Pordenone on a two-year contract.

Career statistics

References

External links

1992 births
Living people
People from Alghero
Footballers from Sardinia
Italian footballers
Association football midfielders
Serie B players
Serie C players
Treviso F.B.C. 1993 players
Cagliari Calcio players
F.C. Lumezzane V.G.Z. A.S.D. players
Venezia F.C. players
Modena F.C. players
A.C. Carpi players
Virtus Verona players
U.S. Triestina Calcio 1918 players
Pordenone Calcio players